Maksim Fyodorov may refer to:
 Maksim Fyodorov (footballer, born 1986), Russian footballer (striker)
 Maksim Fyodorov (footballer, born 1989), Russian footballer (midfielder)